Anant Chaturdashi is a festival dedicated to  Lord Vishnu, it is observed and celebrated by Hindus and Jains. Anant Chaturdashi is the last day of the ten-day-long Ganeshotsav or Ganesh Chaturthi festival and is also called Ganesh Chaudas when devotees bid adieu to the deity Ganesha by immersing (visarjana) his idols in water on Anant Chaturdashi. Chaturdashi is the 14th day of the lunar fortnight. In the normal course, Anant Chaturdashi falls 10 days after Ganesh Chaturthi.

Jain religious observance

This is an important day in the Jain calendar of festivities. Swetambara Jains observe Parv Paryushana in the last 10 days of the bhado month- Digambar Jains observe ten days of the Dus Lakshan Parv and Chaturdashi (also known as Anant Chaudas) is the last day of Daslakshan Parv. Kshamavani, the day the Jains ask for forgiveness for mistakes they have made intentionally or otherwise, is observed one day after Anant Chaturdashi. This is the day when Lord Vasupujya, 12th Tirthankara of the present cosmic cycle, attained nirvana.

Hindu religious observance

In parts of Nepal, Bihar and Eastern U.P., the festival is closely linked to Kshira Sagara (Ocean of Milk) and Vishnu's Ananta Roopa. 14 tilakas (small vertical strips) of kumkum or sindoor (vermilion powder) are made on a wooden plank. Fourteen pooris (fried wheat bread) and 14 puas (deep fried sweet wheat bread) are placed on the vermilion strips. A bowl containing panchamrita (made of milk, curd, jaggery or sugar, honey and ghee) symbolizing the Ocean of Milk is placed on this wooden plank. A thread with 14 knots, symbolizing the Ananta Rupa of Vishnu, is wrapped on a cucumber and is swirled five times in the panchamrita. Later, this Anant thread is tied on the right arm above the elbow by men. Women tie this on their left arm. This Anant thread is removed after 14 days.

The story behind the festival
Sushila and Kaundinya

There was a Brahmin named Sumant. With his wife Diksha, he had a daughter named Sushila. After the death of Diksha, Sumant married Karkash, who gave a lot of trouble to Sushila.

Sushila married Kaundinya, and they decided to leave the house to avoid the harassment of the stepmother. On the way, they stopped near a river. Kaundinya went to take bath. Sushila joined a group of women who were worshiping. They told Sushila that they were worshiping "Anant prabhu". "What kind of worship is this?" Sushila asked.

Anant's vow

They told her that it was Anant's vow. They explained its importance and ritual. Some fried "gharga" (made of flour) and "anarase" (special food) are prepared. Half of them have to be given to the Brahmins. A cobra made of "darbha" (sacred grass) is put in a bamboo basket. Then the snake ("shesh") is worshiped with scented flowers, oil lamp, and incense sticks. Food is offered to the snake. A silk string is kept before the God and tied to the wrist. This string is called "anant." It has 14 knots and is coloured with "kumkum." Women tie the "anant" on their left hand and men on their right. The purpose of this vow is to obtain divinity and wealth. It is kept for 14 years.

After listening to this explanation Sushila decided to take the Anant vow. From that day she and Kaundinya began to prosper and became very rich. One day Kaundinya noticed the Anant string on Sushila's left hand. When he heard the story of the Anant vow, he was displeased and maintained that they had become rich, not because of any power of Anant, but because of the wisdom he had acquired by his own efforts. A heated argument followed. At the end Kaundinya took the Anant string from Sushila's hand and threw it into the fire.

After this all sorts of calamities happened in their life, and they were reduced to extreme poverty. Kaundinya understood that it was punishment for having dishonoured "Anant" and decided that he would undergo rigorous penance until God appeared to him.

In search of Anant

Kaundinya went into the forest. There he saw a tree full of mangoes, but no one was eating them. The entire tree was attacked by worms. He asked the tree if he had seen Anant but got a negative reply. Then Kaundinya saw a cow with her calf, then a bull standing on a field of grass without eating it. Then he saw two big lakes joined to each other with their waters mixing with one another. Further, he saw a donkey and an elephant. To every one, Kaundinya asked about Anant, but no one had heard this name. He became desperate and prepared a rope to hang himself.

Then suddenly an old, venerable Brahmin appeared before him. He removed the rope from Kaundinya's neck and led him into a cave. At first, it was very dark. But then a bright light appeared and they reached a big palace. A great assembly of men and women had gathered. The old Brahmin went straight towards the throne.
 
Kaundinya could no longer see the Brahmin but only Anant instead. Kaundinya realized that Anant himself had come to save him and that god was Anant, the Eternal One. He confessed his sin in failing to recognize the Eternal in the string on Sushila's hand. Anant promised Kaundinya that if he made the 14-year vow, he would be free from all his sins and would obtain wealth, children, and happiness. Anant disclosed the meaning of what Kaundinya had seen during the search. Anant explained that the mango tree was a Brahmin, who in a previous life had acquired plenty of knowledge, but had not communicated it to anyone.

The cow was the earth, which at the beginning had eaten all the seeds of plants. The bull was religion itself. Now he was standing on a field of green grass. The two lakes were sisters who loved each other very much, but all their alms were spent on each other only. The donkey was cruelty and anger. Finally, the elephant was Kaundinya's pride.

Gallery

See also

 Ganesh Chaturthi
 Ganesh festival
 Cultural depictions of elephants
 Durga Puja
 Mantrapushpanjali

References

Hindu festivals
Festivals in Maharashtra
August observances
September observances
Hindu festivals in India
Religious festivals in India
Jain festivals
Hindu festivals in Nepal